Home Economics Building may refer to:

in the United States
(by state then city)
 George Washington Carver High School Home Economics Building, Augusta, Arkansas, listed on the NRHP in Woodruff County, Arkansas
 Calico Rock Home Economics Building, Calico Rock, Arkansas, listed on the NRHP in Izard County, Arkansas
 Home Economics Building-University of Arkansas, Fayetteville, Fayetteville, Arkansas, listed on the NRHP in Washington County, Arkansas
 Guy Home Economics Building, Guy, Arkansas, listed on the NRHP in Faulkner County, Arkansas
 Mulberry Home Economics Building, Mulberry, Arkansas, listed on the NRHP in Crawford County, Arkansas
 Quitman Home Economics Building, Quitman, Arkansas, listed on the NRHP in Cleburne County, Arkansas
 Home Economics Building (Torrance High School), Torrance, California, listed on the NRHP in Los Angeles County, California
 Home Economics Building (Bowling Green, Kentucky), listed on the NRHP in Warren County, Kentucky
 Home Economics Building (Vanderbilt University), Nashville, Tennessee
 Pittman Community Center Home Economics Building, Pittman Center, Tennessee, listed on the NRHP in Sevier County, Tennessee